Adidas is a German sports apparel manufacturer.

Adidas or A.D.I.D.A.S. may also refer to:

Adidas SC, a football club in Samoa
"Adidas", a song by Tory Lanez from The New Toronto 3
"A.D.I.D.A.S." (Korn song), a 1997 song by Korn
"A.D.I.D.A.S." (Killer Mike song), a 2003 song by Killer Mike
A.D.I.D.A.S., or All Day I Dream About Spittin''', a 2010 album by Ras Kass
"A.D.I.D.A.S." ("All Day I Dream About Shush"), a 2015 song by Little Mix from their album Get Weird''